The McDouble is a hamburger sold by the fast-food restaurant chain McDonald's. It is a variation on the double cheeseburger, with only one slice of cheese placed between the two beef patties. It was introduced in 1997. It is one of the cheapest products sold by the company.

Description 
The burger contains 390 calories,  23g, 7% of fiber and 20% of daily calcium.
  
The price of the burger depends on their size and at the company, with the price sometimes ranging to $2.99 it is also the cheapest way to buy a burger similar to the Big Mac, and was also referred to as a lifehack, as the burger is half the size of a Big Mac.

History 
The McDouble was introduced in 1997, garnished with lettuce and tomatoes instead of the cheese that currently tops it. 

The bacon McDouble was introduced and costs $2. This sandwich was also added to the U.S. "Dollar Menu & More" in November 2013.

According to the New York Post, people would purchase the McDouble rather than buying the Big Mac.

People on social media, including some radio announcers, claimed that the McDouble was the cheapest and most nutritious food, and it was also claimed to be the cheapest alternative to junk foods.

References

External links
 

McDonald's foods
Products introduced in 1997
Fast food hamburgers